The domino effect is a type of chain reaction.

Domino Effect may also refer to:

 The domino theory, a political theory about the spread of communism
 Revolutionary wave
 Domino Effect (The Blizzards album), 2008
 Domino Effect (Gotthard album), 2007
 "Domino Effect" (Addictive song), 2009
 "Domino Effect", a song by Ozma, from their album Rock and Roll Part Three
 The Domino Effect (novel), a 2003 Doctor Who novel
 "The Domino Effect" (Amphibia), an episode of Amphibia
 "The Domino Effect", an episode of Sex and the City
 The Domino Effect (concert), a 2009 tribute concert to Fats Domino
 The Domino Effect, an album by Zerra One
 Domino Effect, documentary series